The 2022 French Open (officially known as the Yonex French Open 2022 for sponsorship reasons) was a badminton tournament which took place at the Stade Pierre de Coubertin in Paris, France, from 25 to 30 October 2022 and had a total prize of US$675,000.

Tournament
The 2022 French Open was the eighteenth tournament according to the 2022 BWF World Tour. It was a part of the French Open, which had been held since 1935. This tournament was organized by French Badminton Federation with sanction from the BWF.

Venue
This international tournament was held at the Stade Pierre de Coubertin in Paris, France.

Point distribution 
Below is the point distribution table for each phase of the tournament based on the BWF points system for the BWF World Tour Super 750 event.

Prize money 
The total prize money for this tournament was US$675,000. The distribution of the prize money was in accordance with BWF regulations.

Men's singles

Seeds 

 Viktor Axelsen (champion)
 Anders Antonsen (withdrew)
 Lee Zii Jia (first round)
 Chou Tien-chen (first round)
 Kento Momota (withdrew)
 Anthony Sinisuka Ginting (first round)
 Loh Kean Yew (quarter-finals)
 Jonatan Christie (quarter-finals)

Finals

Top half

Section 1

Section 2

Bottom half

Section 3

Section 4

Women's singles

Seeds 

 Akane Yamaguchi (semi-finals)
 Tai Tzu-ying (semi-finals)
 Chen Yufei (second round)
 Carolina Marín (final)
 Ratchanok Intanon (quarter-finals)
 Nozomi Okuhara (second round)
 Pornpawee Chochuwong (first round)
 He Bingjiao (champion)

Finals

Top half

Section 1

Section 2

Bottom half

Section 3

Section 4

Men's doubles

Seeds 

 Takuro Hoki / Yugo Kobayashi (quarter-finals)
 Marcus Fernaldi Gideon / Kevin Sanjaya Sukamuljo (first round)
 Mohammad Ahsan / Hendra Setiawan (first round)
 Aaron Chia / Soh Wooi Yik (first round)
 Fajar Alfian / Muhammad Rian Ardianto (second round)
 Kim Astrup / Anders Skaarup Rasmussen (first round)
 Satwiksairaj Rankireddy / Chirag Shetty (champions)
 Ong Yew Sin / Teo Ee Yi (quarter-finals)

Finals

Top half

Section 1

Section 2

Bottom half

Section 3

Section 4

Women's doubles

Seeds 

 Chen Qingchen / Jia Yifan (quarter-finals)
 Kim So-yeong / Kong Hee-yong (quarter-finals)
 Nami Matsuyama / Chiharu Shida (quarter-finals)
 Mayu Matsumoto / Wakana Nagahara (final)
 Yuki Fukushima / Sayaka Hirota (semi-finals)
 Jongkolphan Kititharakul / Rawinda Prajongjai (second round)
 Apriyani Rahayu / Siti Fadia Silva Ramadhanti (first round)
 Jeong Na-eun / Kim Hye-jeong (quarter-finals)

Finals

Top half

Section 1

Section 2

Bottom half

Section 3

Section 4

Mixed doubles

Seeds 

 Dechapol Puavaranukroh / Sapsiree Taerattanachai (first round)
 Yuta Watanabe / Arisa Higashino (withdrew)
 Zheng Siwei / Huang Yaqiong (champions)
 Tang Chun Man / Tse Ying Suet (withdrew)
 Seo Seung-jae / Chae Yoo-jung (quarter-finals)
 Thom Gicquel / Delphine Delrue (quarter-finals)
 Mark Lamsfuß / Isabel Lohau (semi-finals)
 Tan Kian Meng / Lai Pei Jing (second round)

Finals

Top half

Section 1

Section 2

Bottom half

Section 3

Section 4

References

External links 
Tournament link

French Open
French Open
French Open
French Open